Ian Breakwell (26 May 1943 in Long Eaton, Derbyshire – 14 October 2005 in London) was a world-renowned British fine artist. He was a prolific artist who took a multi-media approach to his observation of society.

Early Life 
Breakwell was born in Derby and studied at Derby College of Art, graduating in 1964.

Career 
During the 1970s Breakwell worked with the Artist Placement Group a pioneering artists' organisation founded in 1966 by Barbara Steveni and  John Latham, together with David Hall, Barry Flanagan, Anna Ridley, and Jeffrey Shaw among others. It was a milestone in Conceptual Art in Britain, reinventing the means of making and disseminating art.

Ian Breakwell was represented by Angela Flowers Gallery from the early seventies to 1983. Three major solo exhibitions were displayed in 1974, 1977 and 1979, 'The Diary and Related Works', 'Beaten' and 'The Walking Man Diary' respectively. He was included in several group shows at Flowers Gallery, such as 'Contemporary Portraits', curated by Matthew Flowers in 1988 on the occasion of the opening of Flowers East, the Gallery's second premises located on Richmond Road in East London. Breakwell was also part of the exhibition 'The Self Portrait: A Modern View', curated by Edward Lucie-Smith and Sean Kelly, which toured in 9 British venues after its initial display at Artsite Gallery (Bath) and featured over 60 artists including Elisabeth Frink, David Hockney, Peter Blake and Eduardo Paolozzi.

APG set out to place artists in the wider social context beyond galleries, museums and the art market by establishing relationships with companies and government departments. The process of a working relationship would be the prime objective, not artwork production. Breakwell's placements included the Department of Health and Social Security; under its auspices, he worked in Broadmoor and Rampton hospitals. The results included a report, co-written with a group of architects, recommending top-to-bottom changes at Rampton, and a film, The Institution (1978), made with the singer-songwriter and artist Kevin Coyne. A diary entry recalls Breakwell's first APG visit to Rampton, which immediately stirred memories of performing there as a child-conjuror: the incongruous juxtaposition is entirely characteristic.

In 1986 Pluto Press published Ian Breakwell's Diary 1964-1985, his idiosyncratic journal, observing fine details of modern society typically overlooked by most people. In the 1980s and 1990s, he made over 21  adaptations of his diary for Channel 4, as Ian Breakwell's Continuous Diaries, produced by Anna Ridley (Analogue Productions). Later he co-edited (with Paul Hammond) two important anthologies, akin to the work of Mass Observation: Seeing in the Dark (1990), an assemblage of hundreds of accounts of cinema-going; and Brought to Book (1994), which documented the myriad forms of bibliophiliac obsession. Although he had a longstanding relationship with the Anthony Reynolds Gallery in London, his keenness to develop new ways of working led to residencies with, among others, Tyne Tees Television (1985) and Durham Cathedral (1994-95).

Works of this period included Auditorium (1994), a film made with composer Ron Geesin, in which we are taken to a variety show, but are only allowed to see the audience's reactions; the results are hilarious and touching. Auditorium was on show at The De La Warr Pavilion, Bexhill, as part of an exhibition, co-curated by Breakwell, called Variety, the title taken from another Breakwell/Geesin film. The pavilion itself was the setting for The Other Side (2002), in which ballroom dancers float serenely through its dreamlike architecture, to the accompaniment of a Schubert nocturne for piano trio.

It was in 2004 that Breakwell was diagnosed with cancer. Typically, he responded with renewed creative energy, creating a series of works that looked unblinkingly at his condition. The resulting images are both painful and beautiful - just as the last pages of his diary will no doubt reveal not only the artist who created them, but unexpected facets of our own experience.

Breakwell is survived by his wife Felicity Sparrow, and by his mother Nancy.

The Tate Archive holds a collection of Breakwell's personal papers, correspondence, photographs and notebooks including documentation of 'The Institution' performances with Kevin Coyne.

Post-Humous Exhibitions 
Quad Gallery, in Breakwell's hometown of Derby, presented a major retrospective of his work in 2010 titled Ian Breakwell: the Elusive State of Happiness, which is also the title of a 1979 work held in the Arts Council England Collection.

In October 2012, The De La Warr Pavilion opened up a new exhibition of Breakwell's work entitled Keep Things As They Are. This was the largest retrospective exhibition to date and all aspects of his work were presented, including works rarely or never exhibited before. The exhibition was spread over two galleries and featured The Other Side. The exhibition consisted of fifty works spanning his career.

References

External links
  Information on Channel 4 TV series Ian Breakwell's Continuous Diaries 
  obituary in the Independent
  Ian Breakwell - The Diary Re-invented
  Ian Breakwell Estate representation
  Ian Breakwell 'Keep Things As They Are'

1943 births
2005 deaths
People from Derby
Deaths from cancer in England
English contemporary artists